This is a list of shopping centres in Ireland, which includes notable shopping complexes listed by county.

Cork
Mahon Point Shopping Centre - second largest in Munster
Wilton Shopping Centre

Donegal
Courtyard Shopping Centre
Letterkenny Shopping Centre

Dublin
Artane Castle Shopping Centre
Blanchardstown Centre - one of the largest shopping complexes in Ireland
Charlestown Shopping Centre
Clarehall Shopping Centre
Donaghmede Shopping Centre
Dundrum Town Centre - one of the largest shopping complexes in Ireland
George's Street Arcade
Ilac Centre
Jervis Shopping Centre
Liffey Valley
Merrion Centre
Northside Shopping Centre
Nutgrove Shopping Centre
Omni Park
Talbot Mall
The Square Tallaght
Stephen's Green Shopping Centre
Stillorgan Shopping Centre - the first shopping centre in Ireland
Swords Pavilions

Limerick
Crescent Shopping Centre, Dooradoyle - largest shopping centre in Ireland outside of Dublin

Westmeath
Athlone Towncentre
Golden Island Shopping Centre

See also
Retail in the Republic of Ireland

Ireland
Shopping malls